Danny Ramirez (born September 17, 1992) is an American actor. He is best known for his roles as Wes in The Gifted, Mario Martinez in On My Block, Joaquin Torres in the Marvel Cinematic Universe, and Lt. Mickey "Fanboy" Garcia in Top Gun: Maverick (2022).

Early life 
Ramirez was born in Chicago and raised in Miami. He is of Colombian and Mexican descent. He attended Miami Coral Park Senior High School. Growing up he wanted to be an athlete and he tried American football and soccer. He says that after encountering injuries  it took him a year to realize he would need a new career.

Career 
Danny Ramirez made his television debut on Showtime's, The Affair followed by roles on NBC's Blindspot and the feature film, Rapid Eye Movement while attending New York University's Tisch School of the Arts.

He played a reoccurring role as Wes on Fox's The Gifted and he was Mario Martinez on the hit Netflix series On My Block. He also guest-starred in Orange Is the New Black. His first notable film credits came shortly after graduating in Sam Levinson's Assassination Nation which premiered at the Sundance Film Festival. He was Chip shortly after that in Metro-Goldwyn-Mayer's remake of the musical Valley Girl.

Recently he has wrapped director Katharine O'Brien's Lost Transmissions (with Simon Pegg, Juno Temple, and Alexandra Daddario) which premiered at the Tribeca Film Festival in 2019, Richard Bates Jr.'s Tone-Deaf which premiered at South by Southwest Film Festival in 2019 and David Raboy's The Giant, which premiered at the Toronto International Film Festival on September 7, 2019.

In August 2018, it was announced Ramirez would be in Top Gun: Maverick, along with Tom Cruise.

In November 2018, Ramirez was presented the Third Annual NYU Stonestreet Granite Award, which was previously awarded to Miles Teller and Rachel Brosnahan.

In 2021, Ramirez played Joaquin Torres in the Disney+ series The Falcon and the Winter Soldier, which is set in the Marvel Cinematic Universe. He will reprise his role in the upcoming film Captain America: New World Order in 2024.

He is to appear in the 2021 movie Root Letter, based on a Japanese video game.

In January 2022, Ramirez was cast in Stars at Noon directed by Claire Denis.

In February 2022, he starred in Hulu's thriller No Exit as Ash.

Filmography

Film

Television

References

External links 

Living people
American male film actors
American male television actors
American people of Colombian descent
American male actors of Mexican descent
1992 births
Male actors from Chicago
21st-century American male actors
Mexican actors
Colombian actors